Prophaecasia is a genus of moths belonging to the subfamily Olethreutinae of the family Tortricidae.

Species
Prophaecasia anthion Diakonoff, 1973
Prophaecasia caemelionopa Diakonoff, 1983

See also
List of Tortricidae genera

References

External links
tortricidae.com

Tortricidae genera
Olethreutinae
Taxa named by Alexey Diakonoff